The 43rd New Brunswick Legislative Assembly represented New Brunswick between February 21, 1957, and May 13, 1960.

David Laurence MacLaren was Lieutenant-Governor of New Brunswick in 1957. He was succeeded by Joseph Leonard O'Brien in May 1958.

J. Arthur Moore was chosen as speaker.

The Progressive Conservative Party led by Hugh John Flemming formed the government.

History

Members 

Notes:

References 
 Canadian Parliamentary Guide, 1959, PG Normandin

Terms of the New Brunswick Legislature
1957 establishments in New Brunswick
1960 disestablishments in New Brunswick
20th century in New Brunswick